Steve Tran (born 22 April 1985) is a French Vietnamese film and television actor. He has appeared in numerous titles, and in 2009, he recorded the soundtrack 'We Can Make It' for the film Tricheuse.

Filmography

References

People from Saint-Germain-en-Laye
Living people
1985 births
Male actors of Vietnamese descent
French people of Vietnamese descent
French male film actors
French male television actors
21st-century French male actors